Jedediah Island Marine Provincial Park is a provincial park in British Columbia, Canada. Anyone is free to camp on Jedediah island; however, it is only accessible by boat. The nearest access is from Lasqueti Island.

The Mattice Family & The Palmers
Evan Mattice and Mary Mattice from Seattle Washington bought the Island in 1949 as a vacation getaway in the summer. They had two sons. For many years the family visited from Seattle with the hopes of living there full time one day. In 1972 Mary and her second husband, Albert W. Palmer, moved to the island and became full-time residents, living there for twenty years. Evan Mattice, Mary’s first husband, continued to visit often after Mary remarried until he died in the early 90’s. Their oldest son and his family one day wanted to move to Jedidiah Island full time. With well wishes from Mary  and Al, he moved his family from Kirkland Washington in 1979 to Vancouver Island BC. He built a house at Long Bay on Jedidiah and began to clear land for horticulture farming.  As soon as his children finished secondary school the eldest son planned to live on Jedidiah full time with his wife.  Mary Palmer decided to sell after her son built his house. In 1994 a small group of residents on Lasqueti Island became concerned that the Palmers might have to sell the property privately after the commitment from a land trust organization fell through, so they organized a campaign to save the island.   In less than six months, more than four million dollars was raised.   A major donation came from the family of Dan Culver, Canadian educator, white water rafting pioneer, sailor and mountain climber, and donations came from all over the province as the campaign gathered steam.   Finally, the Minister for the Environment of the province of BC bought in too and the target amount was surpassed.   However, even at the eleventh hour, the deal was uncertain until Mary Palmer got the provincial park service to agree to Class A status for the island, meaning it could not be logged or mined.   With that commitment in place, she signed the island over to become a new Gulf Islands provincial park.

The Foot

In the summer of 2007, a family visiting Jedediah Island found the remains of a human foot on the beach they were at. It was the first in a series of feet to be discovered over the next two and a half years.

References

External links
Government Park Listing

Provincial Parks of the Gulf Islands
Provincial parks of British Columbia
Protected areas established in 1995
1995 establishments in British Columbia
Marine parks of Canada